Khurgan Lake ( is a lake located in the district of Tsengel, in the Bayan-Ölgii Province of western Mongolia. 

The lake is connected to Khoton Lake by a wide and short channel (about ); both, together with the Dayan Lake, feed the Khovd River. Khurgan Lake is located within the Altai Tavan Bogd National Park.

Climate
The climate is cold. The average temperature is -4 ° C. The warmest month is July, at 14 ° C, and the coldest is December, at -24 ° C. The average rainfall is 278 millimeters per year. The wettest month is July, with 55 millimeters of rain, and the wettest is February, with 6 millimeters.

References 

Lakes of Mongolia
Bayan-Ölgii Province